Several referendums will be held in Switzerland during 2023, with national votes planned for 18 June, 22 October (alongside federal elections) and 26 November.

March referendums
Although 12 March had been scheduled as a voting day, no national referendums were approved for the date. However, cantonal referendums will take place in Geneva (on a proposed increase in the tax rate on profits for large shareholders) and Basel-Stadt (on tax cuts).

June referendums
A national referendum will take place on 18 June on amending the Swiss Federal Constitution to allow the 15% minimum corporate tax rate proposed by the OECD to be implemented. The amendments were approved by parliament on 16 December 2022.

References

Referendums
Swizterland
Referendums in Switzerland